Oxyptilus catathectes is a moth of the family Pterophoridae, that can be found in Indonesia (Java).

References

Oxyptilini
Moths described in 1933
Plume moths of Asia
Moths of Indonesia